Tri-State Speedway is a high-banked  dirt oval track located in Haubstadt, Indiana, approximately  north of Evansville, Indiana. The track currently hosts World of Outlaws sprint cars, USAC sprints, POWRi Lucas Oil WAR sprints, MSCS Sprints, and UMP modifieds.

History 
Opened in 1957 by Ed Helfrich, the track has been owned by the Helfrich family since. NASCAR on FOX commentator Adam Alexander began his career as a public address announcer at the track in the late 1990s. The track has previously hosted events from the World of Outlaws Late Model Series, USAC Midgets, and the Lucas Oil ASCS National Tour. NASCAR Xfinity Series driver Chase Briscoe's father Kevin Briscoe was a five-time champion at Tri-State.

World of Outlaws Winners

References

External links 
 Tri-State Speedway Homepage

Dirt oval race tracks in the United States
Motorsport venues in Indiana
Evansville metropolitan area